Hanerau-Hademarschen is a former Amt ("collective municipality") in the district of Rendsburg-Eckernförde, in Schleswig-Holstein, Germany. The seat of the Amt was in Hanerau-Hademarschen. It was disbanded in January 2012 together with the Amt Aukrug, Amt Hohenwestedt-Land and Hohenwestedt to become Mittelholstein.

The Amt Hanerau-Hademarschen consisted of the following municipalities:

Beldorf
Bendorf 
Bornholt 
Gokels 
Hanerau-Hademarschen
Lütjenwestedt 
Oldenbüttel 
Seefeld
Steenfeld 
Tackesdorf 
Thaden

Former Ämter in Schleswig-Holstein